This is a list of airports that Canadian Airlines International flew to during the 1980s and 1990s until its demise.

Asia

East Asia
 
 Beijing - Beijing Capital International Airport
 Shanghai - Shanghai Hongqiao International Airport
 
 Hong Kong International Airport (after 1998)
 Kai Tak Airport (terminated due to airport closure in 1998)
 
 Nagoya - Nagoya Komaki Airport
 Tokyo - Narita International Airport
 
 Taipei - Taoyuan International Airport

Southeast Asia
 
 Kuala Lumpur
 Kuala Lumpur International Airport
 Subang International Airport (before 1998)
 
 Manila - Ninoy Aquino International Airport
 
 Changi Airport
 
 Bangkok - Don Mueang International Airport

Europe

Eastern Europe
 
 Budapest - Budapest Ferenc Liszt International Airport
 
 Moscow - Sheremetyevo International Airport

Northern Europe
 
 Copenhagen - Copenhagen Airport
 
 London
 Gatwick Airport
 Heathrow Airport
 Manchester - Manchester Airport

Southern Europe
 
 Milan - Milan Malpensa Airport
 Rome - Leonardo da Vinci–Fiumicino Airport

Western Europe
 
 Paris - Charles de Gaulle Airport
 
 Frankfurt - Frankfurt Airport
 Munich
 Munich Airport
 Munich-Riem Airport (terminated due to airport closure)
 
 Amsterdam - Amsterdam Airport Schiphol
 
 Zürich - Zürich Airport

North America

Canada 
 Alberta
 Calgary - Calgary International Airport (hub)
 Edmonton
 Edmonton City Centre Airport (terminated due to airport closure)
 Edmonton International Airport
 Fort McMurray - Fort McMurray International Airport
 British Columbia
 Campbell River - Campbell River Airport
 Comox - Comox Airport
 Kamloops - Kamloops Airport
 Kelowna - Kelowna International Airport
 Nanaimo - Nanaimo Airport
 Penticton - Penticton Regional Airport
 Prince George - Prince George Airport
 Prince Rupert - Prince Rupert Airport
 Sandspit - Sandspit Airport
 Smithers - Smithers Airport
 Terrace - Northwest Regional Airport Terrace-Kitimat
 Vancouver - Vancouver International Airport (hub)
 Victoria - Victoria International Airport
 Manitoba
 Churchill - Churchill Airport
 Flin Flon - Flin Flon Airport
 Gillam - Gillam Airport
 The Pas - The Pas Airport
 Thompson - Thompson Airport
 Winnipeg - Winnipeg James Armstrong Richardson International Airport
 Newfoundland and Labrador
 Deer Lake - Deer Lake Regional Airport
 Gander - Gander International Airport
 Goose Bay - Goose Bay Airport
 Stephenville - Stephenville International Airport
 St. John's - St. John's International Airport
 Wabush - Wabush Airport
 New Brunswick
 Charlo - Charlo Airport
 Fredericton - Greater Fredericton Airport
 Moncton - Greater Moncton International Airport
 Saint John - Saint John Airport
 Northwest Territories
 Fort Smith - Fort Smith Airport
 Hay River - Hay River/Merlyn Carter Airport
 Inuvik - Inuvik (Mike Zubko) Airport
 Norman Wells - Norman Wells Airport
 Yellowknife - Yellowknife Airport
 Nova Scotia
 Halifax - Halifax Stanfield International Airport
 Sydney - JA Douglas McCurdy Sydney Airport
 Nunavut
 Cambridge Bay - Cambridge Bay Airport
 Iqaluit - Iqaluit Airport
 Nanisivik - Nanisivik Airport
 Rankin Inlet - Rankin Inlet Airport
 Resolute - Resolute Bay Airport
 Ontario
 Kingston - Kingston Norman Rogers Airport
 London - London International Airport
 Ottawa - Ottawa Macdonald–Cartier International Airport
 Sault Ste. Marie - Sault Ste. Marie Airport
 Sudbury - Sudbury Airport
 Sarnia - Sarnia Chris Hadfield Airport
 Thunder Bay - Thunder Bay International Airport
 Toronto - Toronto Pearson International Airport (hub) (Terminal 3)
 Windsor - Windsor Airport
 Quebec
 Bagotville - Bagotville Airport
 Baie-Comeau - Baie-Comeau Airport
 Kuujjuarapik - Kuujjuarapik Airport
 Kuujjuaq - Kuujjuaq Airport
 Montreal
 Montréal–Mirabel International Airport
 Montréal–Trudeau International Airport (hub)
 Radisson - La Grande Rivière Airport
 Sept-Îles - Sept-Îles Airport
 Val-d'Or - Val-d'Or Airport
Saskatchewan
 Regina - Regina International Airport
 Saskatoon - John G. Diefenbaker International Airport
 Prince Edward Island
 Charlottetown - Charlottetown Airport
 Yukon
 Whitehorse - Whitehorse International Airport

Mexico 
 Mexico City - Mexico City International Airport
 Monterrey - General Mariano Escobedo International Airport

United States 
 Boston - Boston Logan International Airport
 Chicago - O'Hare International Airport
 Dallas/Fort Worth - Dallas/Fort Worth International Airport
 Erie - Erie International Airport
 Fort Lauderdale - Fort Lauderdale-Hollywood International Airport
 Honolulu - Daniel K. Inouye International Airport
 Las Vegas - Harry Reid International Airport
 Los Angeles - Los Angeles International Airport
 Miami - Miami International Airport
 New York City
 John F. Kennedy International Airport
 LaGuardia Airport
 Orlando - Orlando International Airport
 San Diego - San Diego International Airport
 San Francisco - San Francisco International Airport
 Seattle/Tacoma - Seattle–Tacoma International Airport
 Washington, D.C. - Washington Dulles International Airport

Oceania
 
 Sydney - Sydney Airport
 
 Nadi - Nadi International Airport
 
 Auckland - Auckland Airport

South America 
 
 Buenos Aires - Ministro Pistarini International Airport
 
 Rio de Janeiro - Rio de Janeiro/Galeão International Airport
 São Paulo - São Paulo/Guarulhos International Airport
 
 Santiago - Comodoro Arturo Merino Benítez International Airport
 
 Lima - Jorge Chavez International Airport

Air Canada
Lists of airline destinations